Edgar and Rachel Ross House is a historic home located at Seaford, Sussex County, Delaware. It was built between 1894 and 1897, and is a -story, brick and frame dwelling in the American Foursquare style.  It has a hipped roof with dormers, one-story wraparound porch with Colonial Revival-style columns, and two-story frame ell with a gable roof added between 1897 and 1904.

It was added to the National Register of Historic Places in 1997.

References

Houses on the National Register of Historic Places in Delaware
Colonial Revival architecture in Delaware
Houses completed in 1897
Houses in Sussex County, Delaware
Seaford, Delaware
National Register of Historic Places in Sussex County, Delaware